1095 is a number in the 1000s number range.
1095 may also refer to:

Time
 1095 CE, a year in the 11th-century A.D.
 1095 BC, a year in the 2nd-millennium BCE

Other uses
 1095 Tulipa, the asteroid 1095
 SAE 1095, a grade of carbon steel suitable for springs and blands
 Design 1095 ship, #1095 design of New York Shipbuilding Corporation for USNavy requirements in sealift during WWI
 Form 1095, a 1095, the U.S. IRS tax form